The Lutheran Church is a Lutheran church in the Cetate district of Timișoara. It is the only Lutheran church in Timișoara, the Lutheran community here numbering about 400 people and being composed of Germans, Hungarians, Slovaks and Romanians. The religious service is officiated in all four languages. Nowadays, the church occasionally hosts baroque music concerts, choral performances, classical music concerts or organ concerts.

History 
The first Lutheran service in Timișoara was held in 1795. Since the Lutheran community did not have a church, this initially took place in various municipal institutions. The erection of a Lutheran church in Timișoara was possible only after Emperor Joseph II issued the Toleranzpatent of 13 October 1781. In 1824 the United Protestant Community was founded and the building of the church was decided. The church was built between 1837 and 1839, according to the project of the architect Antal Schmidt, in neoclassical style. The Doric pilasters on two levels of the facade, the triangular pediment, as well as the Ionic pilasters of the tower stand out. The church was consecrated on 27 October 1839. In 1890 the association split into Evangelical and Reformed faiths. The church was retrofitted with a tower in 1901, in which three bronze bells were installed in 1903.

On one side of the church is the vicarage and on the other is a three storey building originally intended as a Lutheran school. This had functioned as a boys' school since 1825, into which a girls' school was integrated in 1859. In 1869 the Lutheran school was closed because the city administration established municipal schools and withdrew the subsidies from the Lutheran Church.

The church, located in Ionel I.C. Brătianu Square, is built on a plot of land on which there were no constructions until 1831. Only in that year the square was parceled out and sold for construction. The church is flanked by constructions erected after that year.

References 

Religious buildings and structures in Timișoara
Lutheran churches in Romania
Churches completed in 1839
Neoclassical church buildings in Romania